Temptation Island may refer to:

 Temptation Island (1959 film), a French drama film
 Temptation Island (1980 film), a 1980 Filipino film
 Temptation Island (2011 film), a 2011 remake film of the 1980 film
 Love Wrecked (also known as Temptation Island internationally), a 2005 romantic-comedy film
 Temptation Island (TV series), a US TV series
 Temptation Island (Bulgarian TV series), a Bulgarian reality show
 "Temptation Island", a 2001 song by Love as Laughter from the album Sea to Shining Sea
 Temptation Island, a novel by Victoria Fox